Dr. Joseph Pејоvsky is the first and current Metropolitan bishop of the Diocese of Kumanovo and Osogovo of the Macedonian Orthodox Church.

Early life

Family

Schooling
Metropolitan Josif in 1995 enrolled at the Faculty of Theology “St Clement of Ohrid” in Skopje, where in 2000 earned a bachelor's degree with thesis topic “The Icons in the History of the Church”. In 2009, he completed his doctoral studies dissertation with the topic “Dogmatic-theological doctrine of hesychasm in the works of St John Climacus , St Symeon the New Theologian, and Gregory Palamas”.

Life in the Church

Episcopal Ministry

See also
 Diocese of Kumanovo and Osogovo
 List of Metropolitans of Diocese of Kumanovo and Osogovo
 Diocese of Polog and Kumanovo
 Kiril of Polog and Kumanovo
 Macedonian Orthodox Church – Ohrid Archbishopric
 Kumanovo

References

External links
 Joseph Biography
 Official Web Page

People from Prilep
Members of the Macedonian Orthodox Church
1977 births
Living people
People from Kumanovo